The 2013 Classica Citta di Padova was the 5th edition of a one-day women's cycle  race held in Padova, Italy on February 27 2013. The tour has an UCI rating of 1.1.

See also
 2013 in women's road cycling

References

2013 in Italian sport
2013 in women's road cycling
Classica Citta di Padova